Lonzi is an Italian surname. Notable people with this surname include:

 Antonella Ragno-Lonzi (born 1940), Italian fencer
 Carla Lonzi (1931–1982), Italian art critic and feminist activist
 Gianni Lonzi (born 1938), Italian water polo player

Italian-language surnames